Stow-Cum-Quy Fen is a  biological Site of Special Scientific Interest west of Lode in Cambridgeshire. Most of it is common land.

The site is calcareous loam pasture, with diverse flora and open pools which have rare aquatic plants. Grassland herbs include purging flax
and salad burnet, and there are aquatic plants such as unbranched bur-reed, mare's tail and bladderwort.

There is access to the site by footpaths from Lode and Horningsea.

References

Sites of Special Scientific Interest in Cambridgeshire